Guiscard or de Guiscard may refer to:
 Guiscard,  commune in the Oise department in northern France

People with the name
 Antoine de Guiscard (1658–1711), French refugee, spy and double
 Catherine de Guiscard (1688–1723), daughter of the Marquis Louis de Guiscard
 Robert Guiscard (c. 1015 – 1085), Norman adventurer
 Roger Guiscard (1031–1101), Norman nobleman who became the first Count of Sicily from 1071 to 1101